Kalundre is a census town in Raigad district in the Indian state of Maharashtra.

Demographics
 India census, Kalundre had a population of 7581. Males constitute 52% of the population and females 48%. Kalundre has an average literacy rate of 80%, higher than the national average of 59.5%: male literacy is 83%, and female literacy is 76%. In Kalundre, 14% of the population is under 6 years of age.

References

Cities and towns in Raigad district